Kyle Breitkopf  is a Canadian born actor who appears in film and television. His first motion picture role was as Barker Simmons in the 2012 feature film Parental Guidance, which earned him a Young Artist Award nomination as Best Supporting Young Actor Age Ten and Under in a Feature Film.

He currently plays Nathan Jr in Canadian comedy series Workin Moms and Sebastian Lutes in Ruby and the Well.

Filmography

References

External links

Living people
Canadian male child actors
Canadian male television actors
Canadian male voice actors
21st-century Canadian male actors
Canadian male film actors
Male actors from Ontario
Year of birth missing (living people)